Dwitiyo Purush is a 2020 Indian Bengali thriller film, directed by Srijit Mukherjee and produced by Shree Venkatesh Films. It is a sequel to the 2011 movie, Baishe Srabon. The film stars Parambrata Chatterjee, Raima Sen, Anirban Bhattacharya . The story of the film follows the arresting of a killer Khoka (played by Anirban Bhattacharya) by DCDD Abhijit Pakrashi (played by Parambrata Chatterjee). The film was theatrically released on 23 January 2020. It was a tribute to detective writers Agatha Christie and Arthur Conan Doyle. The film shows Abhijit Pakrashi's life in a greater detail, showing many twists of his life in the movie.

Plot 
"Malik-ke giye bol Khoka esceche" (Tell your boss Khoka has arrived)

- Khoka (Anirban Bhattacharya), ordering the waiter of a restaurant, showing a flick knife(Opening credits show the day-to-day activities in present-day Chinatown, Kolkata; a place of both tourist attraction and gangsterism) In 1993, during a gang war (in which police and politics got involved) three heinous killings were committed by Khoka, a 15/16-years-old drug-addicted gang leader in Chinatown. These victims were as follows:

 Rumi, a member of a rival gang - he was struck by a knife through the lower abdomen and then ordered his gang member Kalu to use it to carve his name on the man's forehead.
 An unknown police informer- his throat was slit right through with a razor off-screen at a tannery by Kalu and then used it to carve his name on the man's forehead.
 Police officer Pritam Chowdhuryv- he was hacked to death with a sword-like knife and then Kalu used the weapon to carve his name on the man's forehead.

He was captured by Inspector Pranab Roy Chowdhury, elder brother of Prabir Roy Chowdhury.

The story goes forward in 2019 where DCDD Abhijit Pakrashi, who is being regularly haunted by the last scene of Baishe Srabon (Prabir Ray Chowdhury's final murder,i.e. his suicide) is given a case by Police Commissioner Dibakar Bose to capture Khoka who had been out of prison one month ago and committed a murder of a gang rival leader Haroo in the exactly same pattern and in the same place as he did in 1993. Abhijit is himself having a torrid time with his wife, Amrita (Abhijit is a police officer and due to regular cases, he can't give time to his wife, Amrita) and he suspects his wife is having an affair with his journalist colleague, Surya Sinha. Nonetheless, Abhijit meanwhile starts the investigation with a young fellow officer Rajat Chakraborty, much to the despair of Amrita, now that he would not give her any time to spend with him.

The biggest rival for Khoka's gang in 1993 was Afroz's gang. Afroz later died in police custody- some inmates beat him to death. Abdul was the second in command in Afroz's gang. He fled to Hyderabad and the rest of them are scattered all over the Park Circus area. Rumi was part of this gang.

One point is clear- there were no witnesses of the actual murders. Only the body or some part of the body was found in each case. Now if these were part of the gang wars, then the gang members could have been witnesses. But they obviously didn't do it at the time and now they won't be able to- most of them have been shot dead by the police or are rotting in prison, or they're in some other business. The fact that Khoka was a serial killer was wrong. According to Abhijit, he would carve his name on the victim's forehead with a knife to scare the opponent gang or the police. The real question is the motive. What was Khoka's motive for killing those people? Moreover, what about the carving on the forehead? Since there is no proof that it had been done by Khoka since it was a rough carving, it might be spectaculated that it was possibly an imitation.

From old news video footage retrieved from the news channel TV Bangla (due to the courtesy of Surya Sinha) Abhijit finds a person named Gora (now he calls himself Jimmy and runs a restaurant at Chinatown) present in all previous murder spots and he confronts him during which he denied of having connection or memory regarding Khoka. In the due course of time another murder takes place and that of an informer in the same way.

Thankfully meanwhile Abhijit and Amrita are reconciled after their marriage counseling but their happiness was tinged with mass number of tragedies, which followed one another-Rajat is also trapped by Khoka (who pretended to be Abhijit and called Rajat to the third murder spot where the police officer died in 1993) and mercilessly killed by him in the same way. His girlfriend, Ankita and Abhijit became insane and finally Abhijit, gaining his sanity, gets hold off of Jimmy (or rather Gora) forced him after beating him black and blue to call Khoka at the old, burnt down mill in Chinatown for the final showdown.

After the initial verbal confrontation it is revealed that Khoka is actually Paltan, the boyfriend of Khoka (a shocking revelation for one who sees adult Khoka for about 85% of the movie) and was wrongfully taken into custody so that he can take up the identity of actual Khoka and the actual Khoka can live a fresh life. It is also revealed that Abhijit is none other than Khoka. It was done because when Khoka was taken into custody he was so mercilessly beaten by Inspector Pranab Ray Chowdhury (after all, he was the elder brother of Prabir Ray Chowdhury, the inspector who hated criminals, especially murderers) that he lost his memory for amnesia and the old D.I.G. of Police, repentant about the police brutality, suspended Pranab and gave Khoka a new family and new identify as Abhijit Pakrashi (the D.I.G.'s younger brother and sister-in-law adopted him). Paltan, who learnt all these things from DIG's servant, went to see Khoka who was leaving for Asansol and tried to remind him of past life but was shooed away by Khoka's 'mother' and, thinking him a beggar, gave one rupee to the shocked Paltan. As if to add insult to injury, he was captured by Bibek, the DIG's man (another police officer) and forced to live the life of Khoka (When Bibek asked his name, he replies 'Paltan' but was immediately slapped. After getting a slap, shocked and despaired Paltan said 'Khoka! Khoka!'). Paltan loved Khoka very much and hence he accepted to live the life of Khoka to complete the prison term [He said: Tor jonno jail ba home-e jete amar kharap lageni mayri. Lover-er jonno eituku koray-I jay, tai na? (Lit: I didn't mind going jail and home for you, my friend. This can be done for the lover, isn't it?)]. Then from the correctional home he was sent to prison where he spent many years. They made special arrangements for him in prison and really took care of him. After being released from jail after 25 years, Paltan tracks Khoka's whereabouts, and commits the three murders to help Khoka remember his past with the hope to reunite with him and also it was Paltan who got in touch with Gora so that Abhijit can reach Paltan.

Initially Abhijit disagreed (No one can take such insults, specially a police officer) and insulted Paltan with foul words but eventually was cornered by the shocked but determined Paltan with words and the honourable police officer Abhijit Pakrashi, unable to stand anymore, fell on the ground and started crying. Paltan realised that Khoka recognized Paltan and his love relationship and Paltan, now both emotional and happy, out of love after 25 years showed him the one-rupee coin he got earlier from Khoka's 'mother' and hugged and kissed Khoka [Before kissing, Paltan said his final words: Koto miss korechi toke Janis? Keno kosto dili faltu? (Lit: Do you know how much I missed you? Why did you hurt me unnecessarily?)]. But finally Abhijit killed Paltan by shooting him three times so that the last link that can reveal the original identity of Khoka can be eliminated [Before dying Paltan heard Abhijit's famous lines: Kotha-ta phaltu hobe faltu noey, Banglay 'f' bole kichhu hoi Na. (Lit: That would be phaltu (unnecessarily), not faltu (unnecessarily- wrong pronnouciation). There is no 'f' in Bengali)].

The film then ends with a final twist, revealing that back in 1993; Khoka actually never lost his memory (hence Abhijit's reluctance of accepting Khoka as the murderer). He had only suffered from temporary amnesia. He never told the D.I.G or his adoptive parents that his memory had returned; otherwise, he would have been sent to jail and would be doomed forever. He took the opportunity and moved ahead in life, as an extremely honest police officer as shown in the last scene where Khoka (in 1993) from a hospital staff and Abhijit (in 2019) from a fast food stall ordered Khoka's favorite food chicken chowmin and chilli fish. Abhjit, who has collected the one-rupee coin from dead Paltan, tosses it towards the sky and then smirks slyly towards the audience for the first and perhaps, for the last time.

Cast 
 Parambrata Chatterjee as DCDD Abhijit Pakrashi/ Khoka
 Raima Sen as Amrita Mukherjee
 Anirban Bhattacharya as Khoka/Paltan
 Gaurav Chakrabarty as Rajat Chakrabarty
 Rwitobroto Mukherjee as young Khoka
 Abir Chatterjee as Surya Sinha (cameo appearance)
 Subhra Sourav Das as Jimmy/Gora
 Babul Supriyo as Pranab Roy Chowdhury (special appearance)
 Kamaleswar Mukherjee as Police Commissioner Dibakar Bose
 Ridhima Ghosh as Ankita (special appearance)
 Anindya Banerjee as Debabrata Bhowmick
 Soham Maitra as Young Paltan

Release 
The film was released on 23 January 2020.

Soundtrack

References

External links
 
 Dwitiyo Purush (film) on Facebook

2020 films
Bengali-language Indian films
2020s Bengali-language films
Indian thriller films
Films directed by Srijit Mukherji
Films scored by Anupam Roy
2020 thriller films
Indian sequel films
Indian serial killer films
2020s serial killer films